Arthur Brown (March 8, 1843December 12, 1906) was a United States Senator from Utah.

Early life
Arthur Brown was born March 8, 1843, on a farm near Schoolcraft, Kalamazoo County, Michigan. When he was thirteen the family moved to Yellow Springs, Ohio where he attended Antioch College, graduating in 1862. He pursued graduate work at the University of Michigan at Ann Arbor and graduated from the law department in 1864. Brown practiced law in Kalamazoo, where he built a large and successful practice. He was also active politically, though he never held office despite several tries to secure the nomination for prosecuting attorney of the city.

Career
In 1879, he moved to Salt Lake City, Utah Territory, in hopes of being appointed U.S. district attorney for the territory. Failing to do so, he instead set up a private law practice.

Nearing forty and a successful attorney, Brown joined the Republican Party and rose through its ranks. In 1896 the predominantly Republican Legislature elected him and Frank J. Cannon as Utah's first U.S. senators, an office sought by many prominent men as it was the great political prize of statehood. Brown drew the short term, serving in the Senate from January 22, 1896 until March 3, 1897. He was not a candidate for renomination and resumed the practice of law in Salt Lake City.

Brown was also the second cousin of future President Calvin Coolidge and a member of the Phillips Congregational Church, in Salt Lake City.

Death
Brown was first married to Lydia Coon, with whom he had a daughter, Alice. Brown later married Isabel Cameron after separating from Lydia and with her and Isabel had one son, Max.

Brown then met Anne Maddison Bradley and became lovers.  Isabel hired a detective and charged Brown and they were jailed more than once for adultery.

On February 4, 1903 Brown was found guilty of contempt of court in failing to comply with the Salt Lake City court's order to pay Mrs. Brown temporary alimony of $150 month.

On December 8, 1906, Brown was shot in Washington, D.C., by his longtime mistress, Anne Maddison Bradley, who claimed to be the mother of his children.

Bradley found love letters to Brown from Asenath Ann "Annie" Adams Kiskadden (an actress who was the mother of actress Maude Adams). Bradley assumed Brown was having a second affair with Kiskadden, confronted him at The Raleigh Hotel on 12th Street near Pennsylvania Avenue. That night on December 8, 1906 she shot him. Brown died from his wounds four days later, at age 63, and was interred in Mount Olivet Cemetery, Salt Lake City.

At trial, it was revealed that Brown's will renounced Bradley and the two sons she claimed he sired, and a sympathetic jury acquitted her due to temporary insanity.

Brown's murder was featured in an episode of Deadly Women, entitled "Ruthless Revenge".

References

External links

 The Shooting of Arthur Brown  Utah History To-Go

1843 births
1906 deaths
19th-century Congregationalists
20th-century Congregationalists
American Congregationalists
Antioch College alumni
Coolidge family
Deaths by firearm in Washington, D.C.
People murdered in Washington, D.C.
Politicians from Kalamazoo, Michigan
Politicians from Salt Lake City
Republican Party United States senators from Utah
University of Michigan Law School alumni
Utah Republicans
19th-century American politicians
People convicted of adultery